Lahardane McHales GAA (CLG Lath Ardan Mhic Eíl) is a Gaelic football club located in Lahardane, County Mayo. The club draws players from the parish of Addergoole. Lahardane McHales' club colours are black and gold. The club won their first Junior title in 2017 defeating Kilmaine against the odds. They subsequently went on to win the Connacht Junior Football Championship, beating Ballymote (Sligo) 1-15 to 3-05.

Achievements
 Mayo Junior Football Championship: (1)
 2017
 Connacht Junior Club Football Championship (1)
 2017

References

External sources
Club Website

Gaelic football clubs in County Mayo
Gaelic games clubs in County Mayo